This is a list of people who have served as Custos Rotulorum of Buckinghamshire.

 Sir Francis Bryan bef. 1544 – bef. 1547
 Francis Russell, 2nd Earl of Bedford bef. 1547 – c. 1578
 Arthur Grey, 14th Baron Grey of Wilton c. 1578–1593
 Sir John Fortescue 1594–1600
 Sir Francis Fortescue 1600–1617
 George Villiers, 1st Duke of Buckingham 1617–1628
 John Egerton, 1st Earl of Bridgewater 1628–1649
 Interregnum
 John Egerton, 2nd Earl of Bridgewater 1660–1686
 George Jeffreys, 1st Baron Jeffreys 1686–1689
 Thomas Wharton, 5th Baron Wharton 1689–1702
For later custodes rotulorum, see Lord Lieutenant of Buckinghamshire.

References
Institute of Historical Research - Custodes Rotulorum 1544-1646
Institute of Historical Research - Custodes Rotulorum 1660-1828

Local government in Buckinghamshire
Buckinghamshire